Eastern Sports Association's International Tag Team Title was represented by a Trophy, and was defended in the Maritimes from 1969 to 1975.

International Tag Team Champions 

On ESA's 1976 programs, the promotion listed Jack and Jerry Brisco as International Tag Champions, even though they never appeared in the Maritimes as a team. The title had been replaced with the Maritime Tag Team Championship Belts.

International Heavyweight Champion

Global Tag Team Champions

World Tag Team Champions

References
General

Specific

External links
 Title history at wrestling-titles.com

National Wrestling Alliance championships
Tag team wrestling championships